Sudlaneh Rural District is a rural district (dehestan) in the Central District of Quchan County, Razavi Khorasan province, Iran. At the 2006 census, its population was 18,985, in 4,512 families.  The rural district has 34 villages.

References 

Rural Districts of Razavi Khorasan Province
Quchan County